VVP may refer to:

Vidarbha Vikas Party, an Indian political party
Vladimir Putin (born Vladimir Vladimirovich Putin), president of Russia
Vrienden van het Platteland, a former Dutch women's cycling team

See also
VVP Soft UAV, an unmanned helicopter
Yakovlev VVP-6, an experimental military helicopter